Events in the year 1939 in Portugal.

Incumbents
President: Óscar Carmona
Prime Minister: António de Oliveira Salazar

Events
17 March – Signing of the Iberian Pact

Arts and entertainment
The toy company Majora established

Sports
Establishment of the Portuguese Roller Hockey First Division.
F.C. Alverca founded
G.D. Estoril Praia founded
S.L. Nelas founded
Odivelas F.C. founded
Rio Ave F.C. founded

Births

15 July – Aníbal Cavaco Silva, politician
18 September – Jorge Sampaio, lawyer and politician.

Deaths
27 March - António Xavier Pereira Coutinho, botanist (born 1851)
14 April - José Júlio de Souza Pinto, painter (born 1856)

References

 
1930s in Portugal
Portugal
Years of the 20th century in Portugal
Portugal